Al Raya (originally Dilbar, then Ona), is a motor yacht built in 2008 by Lürssen. She was originally built for Russian oligarch Alisher Usmanov and named Dilbar, after Usmanov's mother.

After another, larger yacht also named Dilbar had been built for Usmanov in 2016, the original Dilbar was renamed to Ona and put up for sale. In 2018, the yacht had reportedly been sold to a Middle Eastern buyer and has been renamed Al Raya. The new owners are the Royal Family of Bahrain.

Al Raya'''s exterior was designed by Tim Heywood and her interior by Alberto Pinto.

See also
 Dilbar''
 Luxury yacht
 List of motor yachts by length
 List of yachts built by Lürssen

References 

2008 ships
Motor yachts